The Inferior Five (or I5) are a parody superhero team appearing in books by the American publisher DC Comics. Created by writer E. Nelson Bridwell and artist Joe Orlando, the team premiered in the DC Comics title Showcase #62 (May-June 1966).

The premise is that the characters are the children of members of a superhero team called the Freedom Brigade, a parody of the Justice League of America. In their early appearances, the team went up against spoofs of the Marvel Comics heroes. Showcase #63 featured "Brute Brainard", who was exposed to Phi Beta Kappa radiation and became the giant green hulk known as "Man-Mountain", and in #65, the team visited Dean Egghead's superhero academy to meet the five young "Egg's Men". When the team got their own series, early issues also mocked the Fantastic Four and Thor.

Publication history

First series 
After appearing in Showcase #62, 63, and 65 (1966), they got their own title which lasted 12 issues. The first 10 had new material and were published from 1967 to 1968.

Issues #11 and 12 were published in 1972, and titled Inferior 5 (using the number 5 rather than spelling out the word) and were all reprints, except for the covers. Nothing changed with the alteration of the title.

Pre-Crisis 
The team has appeared only sporadically after their series was canceled, with Showcase #100 being their only new appearance during the Bronze Age of Comic Books. Other appearances include one or two panels (there is disagreement over whether the characters in one panel are the Inferior Five) in Crisis on Infinite Earths, Captain Carrot and His Amazing Zoo Crew! in The Oz–Wonderland War #3 (March 1986), and the Grant Morrison-written Animal Man series. They appear in one panel in JLA: Another Nail as Flash and the Atom take a trip through many dimensions.

Although the Inferior Five's original stories made frequent references to other prominent DC heroes, Captain Carrot and His Amazing Zoo Crew! in The Oz–Wonderland War #3 revealed their adventures to have occurred on "Earth-Twelve", which had its own doppelgangers of the JLA, the Teen Titans, etc., meaning that any such references were out of continuity in relation to the heroes of DC's primary Earth-One.

Post-Crisis 
Following Crisis on Infinite Earths, where the Five were seen in background cameos, the team's sole "continuity" appearance as a team was in the 1991 Angel and the Ape miniseries, where it was revealed that Angel and the Dumb Bunny are half-sisters. Members of the Justice League of America had cameos in the series, indicating that the Inferior Five now existed on the Post-Crisis Earth.

The Inferior Five appear in issue #17 of the Batman: The Brave and the Bold comics. The Inferior Five team up with the Legion of Substitute Heroes in The Brave and The Bold #35 and with Bat-Mite in Bat-Mite #5 (Dec. 2015).

Steve Gerber proposed a Vertigo version of the Inferior Five as a send-up of the "dark 'n' gritty" comics of the period, but this was rejected. Gerber later claimed that DC refused to publish anything with the title on the grounds that it would make them look "inferior" for publishing it.

2019 mini-series 
In September 2019, a 12-issue maxi-series by Keith Giffen was initiated. It was a reinvention of the team, as the protagonists are now five children in the small town of Dangerfield, Arizona. It revolves around a mystery regarding their parents, and they are the only ones that notice something strange is going on. It takes place in 1988, where the invasion was successful on the town of Dangerfield. The aliens are in hiding, still experimenting with the metagene, and keeping a focus on the five kids. The book later reveals that the Invasion is metafictional. The series also contains a backup feature starring Peacemaker. The number of issues was soon reduced from 12 to 6. There was a fifteen month publishing hiatus between issues #4 (December 2019) and #5 (March 2021) with the last two issues released digitally.

Members
 Merryman (Myron Victor, occupation: comic strip artist), a "98 Pound Weakling", he is the son of the Patriot and Lady Liberty (parodying Uncle Sam and Quality Comics' Miss America) and a descendant of Yellowjacket and the Crimson Chrysanthemum (obvious takeoffs on the Green Hornet and the Scarlet Pimpernel). The team's leader, he wears a jester outfit, having decided in the team's first appearance that if he was going to make a fool of himself, he might as well look the part. He is highly intelligent, making him the only team member who is thoroughly aware of the team's disadvantages. Although trained in the martial arts, he is physically a weakling with little practical ability to use such skills. He returned in Final Crisis as coordinator of the residents of Limbo, leading them in assisting the Supermen of the multiverse to fend off an attack from Mandrakk the Dark Monitor, causing Superman to reflect that anyone could be a hero.
 Awkwardman (Leander Brent, occupation: beachcomber), son of Mr. Might (parodying Superman) and the Mermaid (parodying Aquaman). He is super-strong and able to live underwater, having inherited powers from both parents, but is also very clumsy. In keeping with his half-undersea heritage, he requires periodic contact with water, which can consist of simply pouring it over himself with a watering can. His codename is a pun on Aquaman; his surname "Brent" rhymes with Superman's surname of "Kent".
 The Blimp (Herman Cramer, occupation: diner owner), the obese son of Captain Swift (parodying the Flash) who could fly but, as he lacked his father's speed powers, could only fly at super slow speeds — with a tail wind. He was one of the few superheroes to attend the funeral of Booster Gold.
 White Feather (William King, occupation: photographer), son of The Bowman (parodying Green Arrow) and an unidentified woman. He was a superb archer when he did not think anyone was watching; people made him nervous (as did just about everything else). His surname "King" parallels Green Arrow's surname "Queen", and his codename is a reference to the traditional symbol of cowardice.
 The Dumb Bunny (Athena Tremor, occupation: model), the stupid but super-strong daughter of Princess Power (parodying Wonder Woman) and Steve Tremor (parodying Steve Trevor). In later continuity (revealed in Angel and the Ape (vol. 2) #1), she is still the daughter of Princess Power; it is later revealed that her father is actually Professor Theo O'Day. Shortly after Athena's birth, Professor O'Day left Princess Power and fell in love with a non-powered woman. Together, they had a daughter, Angel Beatrix O'Day (who is Athena's half-sister). After Angel's mother died, Professor O'Day reconciled with Princess Power and raised Athena and Angel together. As the Dumb Bunny, Athena is described as "strong as an ox and almost as intelligent". She is named after the Greek goddess of wisdom, Athena. Although her surname "Tremor" is still given in current continuity, she is the daughter of Professor O'Day instead of Steve Tremor. According to the end of The Brave and The Bold #35, Dumb Bunny actually appears to be extremely intelligent, as she clearly understands a scientist and explains it to the other people. Since her father is a professor, the "Dumb" role play may be her "trick" and also not wanting to overshadow "Merryman".

Superior Five
In the miniseries Villains United, the Inferior Five were paid homage as a group of supervillains who are tentatively known as the Superior Five. Each member has the abilities of an I5 member but, aside from being evil, are serious and modern-styled characters. They consist of:

 Tremor (Awkwardman)
 Hindenburg (the Blimp)
 Splitshot (White Feather)
 Lagomorph (the Dumb Bunny)
 Jongleur (Merryman)

Little has been seen of these characters except for one panel in Villains United #4 and a few shots of them in the background in the same issue. They are among the imprisoned supervillains in Salvation Run. Jongleur is one of the villains sent to retrieve the Get Out of Hell Free card from the Secret Six.

In other media
 The Inferior Five make a cameo appearance in the Batman: The Brave and the Bold episode "Mayhem of the Music Meister!".
 The Inferior Five appear as assist characters in Scribblenauts Unmasked: A DC Comics Adventure.

Awards
The series and characters have been recognized in the field, being awarded a 1966 Alley Award for Best Humor Title: Costumed.

References

External links
DC page: IF2019
Inferior Five at Don Markstein's Toonopedia. Archived from the original on July 12, 2015.
Inferior Five story summaries
Comic Book Awards Almanac

Characters created by Joe Orlando
Comics characters introduced in 1966
DC Comics superhero teams
Parody superheroes